Palmstierna is a surname. Notable people with the surname include: 

Ellen Palmstierna (1869–1941), Swedish women's rights and peace activist
Erik Palmstierna (1877–1959), Swedish politician and diplomat
Jacob Palmstierna (1934–2013), Swedish banker
Nils-Fredrik Palmstierna (1919–1990), Swedish Air Force officer

Swedish-language surnames